Ballet Cymru is a touring classical ballet company based in Newport, South Wales, formed in 1986 by dancer and choreographer Darius James. Currently formed of 12 dancers, the company tours to around 70 venues each year throughout the UK. The Independent described them as "a brightly gifted, energetic young ensemble that tours England, Wales and Ireland, taking dance to smaller venues that might otherwise be starved of ballet."

History
Ballet Cymru, formerly Independent Ballet Wales and, prior
to that, Cwmni Ballet Gwent, is a touring classical ballet company based in Newport, South Wales, formed in 1986 by dancer and choreographer Darius James. Currently formed of 12 dancers, the company tours to around 70 venues each year throughout the UK. The Independent described them as "a brightly gifted, energetic young ensemble that tours England, Wales and Ireland, taking dance to smaller venues that might otherwise be starved of ballet."

Current Dancers

Andrea Battagia,
Krystal Lowe,
Beth Meadway,
Miguel Fernandez,
Alex Hallas,
Maria Teresa Brunello,
Joshua Feist,
Danila Marzili,
Beau Dilen,
Isobal Holland,
Robbie Moorcroft

Community work

The company undertakes education work as part of its programme.

Past members
Past members have joined ballet companies such as English National Ballet, Dutch National Ballet and Scottish Ballet.

Repertoire
 Giselle (2006)
 The Canterbury Tales (2006)
 Coppélia (2007)
 The Bride of Flowers (2007)
 Under Milk Wood (2008)
 Romeo and Juliet (2008)
 A Midsummer Night's Dream (2009)
 How Green Was My Valley? (2009)
 Lady of Llyn y Fan Fach (The Lady of the Lake) (2010)
 Roald Dahl's Little Red Riding Hood and The Three Little Pigs (2012)
 Stuck in the Mud (2013)
 Week of Pines and The Same Flame (2014)

References

External links
 Official website

Companies based in Newport, Wales
Culture in Newport, Wales
1986 establishments in Wales
Ballet Cymru
Dance companies in the United Kingdom
Performing groups established in 1986
Organisations based in Newport, Wales